Magnesium oxalate is an organic compound comprising a magnesium cation with a 2+ charge bonded to an oxalate anion.  It has the chemical formula MgCO.  Magnesium oxalate is a white solid that comes in two forms: an anhydrous form and a dihydrate form where two water molecules are complexed with the structure.  Both forms are practically insoluble in water and are insoluble in organic solutions.

Natural occurrence 
Magnesium oxalate has been found naturally near Mill of Johnston, which is located close to Insch in northeast Scotland. This naturally occurring magnesium oxalate is called glushinskite and occurs at the lichen/rock interface on serpentinite as a creamy white layer mixed in with the hyphae of the lichen fungus. A scanning electron micrograph of samples taken showed that the crystals had a pyramidal structure with both curved and striated faces. The size of these crystals ranged from 2 to 5 μm.

Synthesis and reactions 

Magnesium oxalate can by synthesized by combining a magnesium salt or ion with an oxalate.
 Mg2+ + CO2− → MgCO
A specific example of a synthesis would be mixing Mg(NO3)2 and KOH and then adding that solution to dimethyl oxalate, (COOCH3)2.

When heated, magnesium oxalate will decompose. First, the dihydrate will decompose at 150 °C into the anhydrous form.
 MgCO•2H2O → MgCO + 2 H2O

With additional heating the anhydrous form will decompose further into magnesium oxide and carbon oxides between 420 °C and 620 °C. First, carbon monoxide and magnesium carbonate form.  The carbon monoxide then oxidizes to carbon dioxide, and the magnesium carbonate decomposes further to magnesium oxide and carbon dioxide.
 MgCO → MgCO + CO
 CO + 1/2 O2 → CO2
 MgCO → MgO + CO2

Magnesium oxalate dihydrate has also been used in the synthesis of nano sized particles of magnesium oxide, which have larger surface are to volume ratio than conventionally synthesized particles and are optimal for various applications, such as in catalysis. By using a sol-gel synthesis, which involves combining a magnesium salt, in this case magnesium oxalate, with a gelating agent, nano sized particles of magnesium oxide can be produced.

Health and safety 
Magnesium oxalate is a skin and eye irritant. If inhaled, it will irritate the lungs and mucous membranes.  Magnesium oxalate has no known chronic effects nor any carcinogenic effects.  Magnesium oxalate is non-flammable and stable, but in fire conditions it will give off toxic fumes.  According to OSHA, magnesium oxalate is considered to be hazardous.

See also 
 Calcium oxalate
 Oxalic acid

References 

Oxalates
Magnesium compounds
Inorganic compounds